Willi Schaeffers (1884–1962) was a German film actor and cabaret performer.

Selected filmography
 The Blue Mouse (1913)
 A Blackmailer's Trick (1921)
 Nameless Woman (1927)
 The Street Song (1931)
 Kiki (1932)
 Peter Voss, Thief of Millions (1932)
 The Black Whale (1934)
 Princess Turandot (1934)
 Playing with Fire (1934)
 The Daring Swimmer (1934)
 What Am I Without You (1934)
 If It Were Not for Music (1935)
 The Valiant Navigator (1935)
 Every Day Isn't Sunday (1935)
 All Because of the Dog (1935)
 The Castle in Flanders (1936)
 Family Parade (1936)
 Diamonds (1937)
 Men Without a Fatherland (1937)
 Monika (1938)
 The Mystery of Betty Bonn (1938)
 The Deruga Case (1938)
 Red Orchids (1938)
 I'll Never Forget That Night (1949)
 Hit Parade (1953)
 Red Roses, Red Lips, Red Wine (1953)
 The Big Chance (1957)

References

Bibliography
 Jelavich, Peter. Berlin Cabaret. Harvard University Press, 2009.

External links

1884 births
1962 deaths
German male film actors
German male silent film actors
20th-century German male actors